El Santuario is a town and municipality in the Antioquia Department, Colombia. Part of the subregion of Eastern Antioquia.  El Santuario was founded on 11 March 1765 by Captain Antonio Gómez de Castro. Its elevation is 2.150 masl with an average temperature of 17 °C.  The distance reference from Medellín city, the capital of Antioquia Department, is 57 km and it has a total area of 75 km².  This town is well known for being the place where Guillermo Zuluaga "Montecristo" and Crisanto Alonso Vargas "Vargasvil" were born.  The more significantly source of its economy is agriculture, mainly vegetables, beans, potatoes and legume cultivation.

Municipalities of Antioquia Department